The Stovall House is a historic home in Tampa, Florida. It is located at 4621 Bayshore Boulevard. On September 4, 1974, it was added to the U.S. National Register of Historic Places.

See also
Wallace Stovall

References and external links

 Hillsborough County listings at National Register of Historic Places
 Hillsborough County listings at Florida's Office of Cultural and Historical Programs

Houses in Tampa, Florida
Houses on the National Register of Historic Places in Hillsborough County, Florida
History of Tampa, Florida
1909 establishments in Florida
Houses completed in 1909